
Olecko County is a unit of territorial administration and local government (powiat) in Warmian-Masurian Voivodeship, northern Poland.

When powiats were re-introduced in the Polish local government reforms of 1999, the present Gołdap and Olecko Counties made up a single entity (called powiat olecko-gołdapski or Olecko-Gołdap County). This was divided into two in 2002.

As of 2006 its total population is 34,215, out of which the population of Olecko is 16,169 and the rural population is 18,046.

Neighbouring counties
Olecko County is bordered by Gołdap County to the north, Suwałki County to the east, Ełk County to the south and Giżycko County to the west.

Administrative division
The county is subdivided into four gminas (one urban-rural and three rural). These are listed in the following table, in descending order of population.

References
Polish official population figures 2006

 
Olecko